Ryjewo  (German Rehhof) is a village in Kwidzyn County, Pomeranian Voivodeship, in northern Poland. It is the seat of the gmina (administrative district) called Gmina Ryjewo.

The village has a population of 2,750.

Notable residents
 Paul Brandt (1915–1944), German Luftwaffe ace

References

Ryjewo